The Colombina is an award that is awarded annually in the form of a bronze statue by a jury of the Dutch Association of Theater and Concert Hall Directors to the most impressive female supporting actress of the Dutch theater season. 

First awarded in 1964, the statuette has been designed by  since 2005. It is named after the Columbina stock character from the commedia dell'arte, and it is a companion piece to the Arlecchino, the prize  awarded to the most impressive male supporting actor of the season.

Winners

Past winners were:
 1964: Enny Meunier
 1965: Elisabeth Andersen
 1966: Loudi Nijhoff
 1967: Anne Wil Blankers
 1968: Marja Habraken
 1969: Kitty Janssen
 1970: Petra Laseur
 1971: Ann Hasekamp
 1972: Elisabeth Andersen
 1973: Cançi Geraerdts
 1974: Sjoukje Hooymaayer
 1975: Josée Ruiter
 1976: Ellen Vogel
 1977: Henny Orri
 1978: Bea Meulman
 1979: Pauline van Rhenen
 1980: Kitty Courbois
 1981: Trins Snijders
 1982: Nettie Blanken
 1983: Do van Stek
 1984: Marieke Beversluis
 1985: Catherine ten Bruggencate
 1986: Marlies Heuer
 1987: Anita Menist
 1988: Els Ingeborg Smits
 1989: Els Dottermans
 1990: Yvonne van den Hurk
 1991: Trudy de Jong
 1992: Elja Pelgrom
 1993: Anneke Blok
 1994: Marisa van Eyle
 1995: Catherine ten Bruggencate
 1996: Karlijn Sileghem
 1997: Roos Ouwehand
 1998: Halina Reijn
 1999: Sien Eggers
 2000: Tamar van den Dop
 2001: Margôt Ros
 2002: Tjitske Reidinga
 2003: Carice van Houten
 2004: Gilda De Bal
 2005: Celia Nufaar
 2006: Lineke Rijxman
 2007: Fania Sorel
 2008: Janni Goslinga
 2009: Wine Dierickx
 2010: Nanette Edens
 2011: Lies Pauwels
 2012: Frieda Pittoors
 2013: Astrid van Eck
 2014: Kirsten Mulder
 2015: Antoinette Jelgersma
 2016: Ilke Paddenburg
 2017: Lotte Dunselman
 2018: Maureen Teeuwen
 2019: Rosa van Leeuwen
 2020: not awarded due to COVID19; with nominations
 2021: Sanne Samina Hanssen
 2022: Helen Kamperveen

References

Awards established in 1964
Dutch awards
Theatre acting awards
1964 establishments in the Netherlands